The 2022 Toyota/Save Mart 350 was a NASCAR Cup Series race held on June 12, 2022, at Sonoma Raceway in Sonoma, California. Contested over 110 laps on the  road course, it was the 16th race of the 2022 NASCAR Cup Series season.

Report

Background

It is host to one of only seven NASCAR Cup Series races each year that are run on road courses. It is also host to the NTT IndyCar Series and several other auto races and motorcycle races such as the American Federation of Motorcyclists series. Sonoma Raceway continues to host amateur, or club racing events which may or may not be open to the general public. The largest such car club is the Sports Car Club of America.

In 2022, the race was reverted to racing the club configuration.

Entry list
 (R) denotes rookie driver.
 (i) denotes driver who is ineligible for series driver points.

Practice

Practice results

Qualifying

Qualifying results

Race

Stage Results

Stage One
Laps: 25

Stage Two
Laps: 30

Final Stage Results

Stage Three
Laps: 55

Race statistics
 Lead changes: 6 among 6 different drivers
 Cautions/Laps: 4 for 14
 Red flags: 0
 Time of race: 2 hours, 48 minutes and 22 seconds
 Average speed:

Media

Television
Fox NASCAR televised the race in the United States on FS1 for the sixth year. Mike Joy was the lap-by-lap announcer, while Larry McReynolds and three-time Sonoma winner, three-time NASCAR Cup Series champion and co-owner of Stewart-Haas Racing Tony Stewart were the color commentators. McReynolds replaced normal analyst Clint Bowyer, the 2012 Sonoma winner, on leave for what was confirmed on June 16 as legal issues during the investigation into a fatal crash near Osage Beach, Missouri where Bowyer's car struck and killed an impaired woman believed to be under the influence of methamphetamine.  The incident occurred June 5 on his way from the previous race in the St. Louis metropolitan region to Emporia, Kansas, where he owns dealerships.

Jamie Little and Vince Welch handled pit road for the television side. 

This was Fox Sports' last Cup race for their portion of the 2022 season as NBC Sports and USA Network takes over NASCAR broadcasts for the rest of the season.

Radio
Radio coverage of the race was broadcast by the Performance Racing Network. PRN's broadcast of the race was simulcasted on Sirius XM NASCAR Radio. Doug Rice and Mark Garrow announced the race in the booth while the field was racing on the pit straightaway. Brett McMillan called the race from a stand outside of turn 2 when the field was racing up turns 2, 3 and 3a. Brad Gillie called the race from a stand outside of turn 7a when the field was racing through turns 4a and 7a. Nick Yeoman called the race when the field raced thru turns 8 and 9. Pat Patterson called the race from a billboard outside turn 11 when the field was racing through turns 10 and 11. Heather DeBeaux, Alan Cavanna and Wendy Venturini reported from pit lane during the race.

Standings after the race

Drivers' Championship standings

Manufacturers' Championship standings

Note: Only the first 16 positions are included for the driver standings.
. – Driver has clinched a position in the NASCAR Cup Series playoffs.

Notes

References

Toyota Save Mart 350
Toyota Save Mart 350
Toyota Save Mart 350
NASCAR races at Sonoma Raceway